Vancouver Media Sociedad Limitada, is a Spanish media group, present in the television, founded in 2016 by Álex Pina, creator of the Spanish television series Money Heist, from 2017 acquired by Netflix.

History
The first production was La Casa de Papel (Money Heist), which premiered on Antena 3 on May 2, 2017 with more than four million viewers.

Main productions
 Money Heist
 The Pier
 White Lines
 Sky Rojo

Awards and nominations
In 2018 was nominated at the Camille Awards as best Production Company.

References

External links
  

Television production companies of Spain
Mass media companies established in 2016
Money Heist